Amitava Chakraborty (born 7 November 1981) is an Indian former cricketer. He played seventeen first-class matches for Bengal between 2001 and 2007.

See also
 List of Bengal cricketers

References

External links
 

1981 births
Living people
Indian cricketers
Bengal cricketers
Cricketers from Kolkata